Laviolette–Saint-Maurice is a provincial electoral district in Quebec. It was created from parts of Laviolette and Saint-Maurice districts.  It will be first contested in the 2018 Quebec general election. It notably includes the cities of Shawinigan and La Tuque.

Members of the National Assembly

Election results

References

Quebec provincial electoral districts
Shawinigan
La Tuque, Quebec